Changeling is the second studio album by the Irish rock musician Camille O'Sullivan, released on 4 February 2012 on Little Cat Records.

Recorded throughout 2011 at various recording studios in Dublin with producers and musicians Feargal Murray and Eanna Hickey, Changeling consists entirely of cover versions of songs by artists including Nick Cave, Tom Waits and Radiohead, who O'Sullivan describes as "influences." The album also contains two songs written exclusively for O'Sullivan by collaborator/producer Eanna Hickey and Snow Patrol frontman Gary Lightbody.

Upon its release, Changeling received positive reviews and peaked at number 45 and number 6 in the Irish Albums Chart and Irish Independent Albums Chart, respectively. The album was also supported with a small nationwide tour, launched at Tower Records in Dublin on 16 February, and was followed by a European tour throughout 2012.

Track listing

Chart positions

References

2012 albums
Camille O'Sullivan albums